Tickford is an automotive engineering company. 

Tickford may also refer to:
 Tickford Racing, team which competes in the Virgin Australia Supercars Championship
 Tickford in Newport Pagnell, Buckinghamshire, England; location of:
 Tickford Priory, medieval monastic house
 Tickford Bridge, 1810 iron bridge over the River Ouzel (or Lovat)